Harry Steele Savage (1898–1970) was an American illustrator, primarily of books for children and young adults.

Professional career 
Savage was born on December 21, 1898, in Central Lake, Michigan to Irish and French Canadian immigrants, Flora (McLaughlin) and William Harry Savage. The earliest known reference to Savage's life as an artist comes from his World War 1 draft card, where he lists his occupation as artist for the J.L. Hudson Company in Detroit, Michigan.  He is probably best known for the illustrations in Edith Hamilton's Mythology.  Other books he illustrated include Burton's The Arabian Nights (Bennett Cerf, 1932, Triangle Books), Stories of the Gods and Heroes by Sally Benson, Hurlbut's Story of the Bible (Revised edition), The Rainbow Book of Bible Stories by J. Harold Gwynne (1956), Life in the Ancient World by Bart Keith Winer (1961), and The Golden Library Book of Bible Stories by Jonathan Braddock.  He drew several posters and covers for science fiction books and magazines that appeared in the 1960s and 1970s. He was also an illustrator of World War II era posters such as the recruiting poster: For Your Country's Sake Today, For Your Own Sake Tomorrow

Notable cover art 

 1940 - No Other Man
 1967 - Golden Blood
 1967 - The Well of the Unicorn
 1969 - Breakthrough
 1969 - Stand on Zanzibar
 1970 - Between Planets
 1970 - The Rolling Stones
 1970 - The Scorcerer's Skull
 1970 - The Star Beast
 1970 - Time for the Stars
 1970 - Starbreed
 1970 - The Long Result
 1970 - The Squares of the City
 1970 - The Whole Man
 1970 - Anti-Man
 1970 - The Citadel of Fear
 1970 - Black in Time
 1970 - Report of Probability A
 1970 - Tunnel in the Sky
 1970 - Barrier World
 1970 - Rocket Ship Galileo 
 1971 - Red Planet
 1971 - Have Space Suit Will Travel

Notes

1898 births
1970 deaths
American children's book illustrators
Science fiction artists